Blastovalva paltobola is a moth of the family Gelechiidae. It was described by Edward Meyrick in 1921. It is found in South Africa.

The wingspan is about 9 mm. The forewings are shining white with the costal edge dark fuscous towards the base and with a very oblique elongate dark fuscous mark towards the dorsum before the middle. There is a dark fuscous line running from the disc beyond the middle to the apical patch, where it meets a similar shorter line from an irregular suffused spot on the tornus. A patch is found along the apical fourth of the costa, consisting of three oblique wedge-shaped dark brown spots separated by white strigulae, the second strigula limiting a blackish apical dot, and preceded by two minute linear black dots surrounded by pale ochreous before the termen. The hindwings are grey.

References

Endemic moths of South Africa
Moths described in 1921
Anacampsinae